chitambira may refer to:

In Shona language (Zimbabwe), receive or dance for
Family name of a Shona speaking tribe, originally from Masvingo province of Zimbabwe